Lawrence Gordon (born March 30, 1984) is a former professional Canadian football defensive back. He was born in Hallandale Beach Florida.  He played college football for the Akron Zips.  He was signed by the Tiger-Cats as a street free agent in 2006.  He has most recently played for the Edmonton Eskimos of the Canadian Football League

References

External links
Just Sports Stats
Hamilton Tiger-Cats bio

1984 births
Living people
Canadian football defensive backs
Edmonton Elks players
Florida Atlantic Owls football players
Hamilton Tiger-Cats players
People from Hallandale Beach, Florida
Hallandale High School alumni
Sportspeople from Broward County, Florida
Players of Canadian football from Florida